Yanta may refer to:

Yanta District, in Xi'an, Shaanxi, China
John Yanta (1931-2022), Roman Catholic bishop in the United States
Yanta (village), a village in Southern Lebanon